"I Wanna Go Back" is a 1984 song by American rock band Billy Satellite, written by band members Monty Byrom, Danny Chauncey, and Ira Walker, that achieved major popularity when recorded by Eddie Money in 1986. Another version was recorded by former Santana/Journey keyboardist/singer Gregg Rolie for his self-titled 1985 debut solo album.

Billy Satellite version
Released in 1984 as the band's debut single, it reached the Billboard Hot 100 chart on December 8, 1984, charting for three weeks and peaking at number 78, and number 72 Cash Box.  The mid-tempo song is reliant on synthesizers but contains a short guitar solo in the bridge and some guitar in the outro.  The music video begins with the members of Billy Satellite driving a jeep to Alameda, California to the site of a previous live show; the latter portion features the band playing in a bar there.

Eddie Money version
American rock singer Eddie Money covered the song on his 1986 album Can't Hold Back, and it was released as the follow-up single to the top-ten hit "Take Me Home Tonight".  It reached number 14 on the Billboard Hot 100, #33 Adult Contemporary, and number three on the Album Rock Tracks chart in early 1987.  Money's version, which AllMusic's Mike DeGagne says has "sincere, semi-ballad charm," still relies heavily on synthesizers but includes more guitar and adds saxophone in the intro, bridge, and outro, with backing vocals by Marilyn Martin.  The music video to his version features Money revisiting a high school interspersed with him and his band playing before a concert audience. Martin can also be seen in the video as mysterious figure that Money briefly follows through the crowd at the school dance, representing the girl who got away.

Chart history

Weekly charts

References

1984 songs
1984 singles
1986 singles
Eddie Money songs
Songs written by Monty Byrom
Capitol Records singles
Columbia Records singles